Garnseys Airport  is a privately owned, public use airport located one nautical mile (2 km) south of the central business district of Schuylerville, a village in the Town of Saratoga, Saratoga County, New York, United States. It also serves as a seaplane base with a landing area on the Hudson River.

Facilities and aircraft 
Garnseys Airport covers an area of 15 acres (6 ha) at an elevation of 100 feet (30 m) above mean sea level. It has one runway designated 2/20 with a turf surface measuring 2,600 by 103 feet (792 × 31 m). It also has a seaplane landing area designated 2W/20W with a water surface measuring 9,999 by 750 feet (3,048 × 229 m).

For the 12-month period ending August 16, 2012, the airport had 1,100 general aviation aircraft operations, an average of 91 per month. At that time there were three single-engine aircraft based at this airport.

References

External links 
 Aerial image as of April 1995 from USGS The National Map

Airports in New York (state)
Transportation buildings and structures in Saratoga County, New York